Narayanavanam mandal is one of the 34 mandals in Tirupati district in the Indian state of Andhra Pradesh. It is administered as a part of Srikalahasti revenue division.

History 
Narayanavanam mandal was a part of Chittoor district until 2022. It was made part of the newly formed Tirupati district effective from 4 April 2022.

Demographics 

It had a sex ratio of 985. The Scheduled Castes and Scheduled Tribes made up 10,417 and 1,983 of the population respectively. It had a literacy rate of 71.46% with 80.44% among males and 62.39% among females.

Administration 
Narayanavanam mandal is a part of Srikalahasti revenue division. As of 2011 census, the mandal comprises Narayanavanam census town and the following 15 villages:

Politics 
Narayanavanam mandal is a part of Satyavedu Assembly constituency and Tirupati Lok Sabha constituency. , the mandal had 24,544 eligible voters with 12,216 male voters and 12,328 female voters.

References 

Mandals in Tirupati district